Far Horizons is a historic house located on Learned Road in Dublin, New Hampshire.  Completed in 1899, it is a distinctive local example of Queen Anne architecture, and was home for a time to physicist Robert Kraichnan.  The house was added to the National Register of Historic Places on December 15, 1983.

Description and history
Far Horizons is located in central southern Dublin, high on the eastern flank of Mount Monadnock, at the end of a long drive up the mountainside from Learned Road. It is a -story wood-frame house, with a hipped roof and exterior finished in board siding. The Queen Anne house features an octagonal turret on one of its front corners, and verandahs on two sides. A gabled dormer projects from one face above the verandah. A single-story gabled ell extends to the north, and a two-car garage and former carriage house stand nearby.

Henry Dwight Learned built the house as a seasonal residence on his family's farm in 1898–99.  Learned was prominent in local affairs, and served as a state senator.  Physicist Robert Kraichnan was one of its 20th-century owners; Kraichnan put an addition on the house in 1968, and adapted it for year-round occupation.

See also
National Register of Historic Places listings in Cheshire County, New Hampshire

References

External links

Houses on the National Register of Historic Places in New Hampshire
Queen Anne architecture in New Hampshire
Houses completed in 1898
Houses in Dublin, New Hampshire
National Register of Historic Places in Dublin, New Hampshire